During the 2001–02 English football season, Watford competed in the Football League First Division.

Season summary
In the 2001–02 season, Gianluca Vialli was named as Taylor's managerial replacement. Vialli made several high-profile signings, and wage bills at the club soared, with Vialli himself earning almost a million pounds a year. However, the season was disappointing, with the club finishing 14th in the division, and Vialli was sacked after only one season, having refused to resign.

Final league table

Results
Watford's score comes first

Legend

Football League First Division

FA Cup

League Cup

Players

First-team squad
Squad at end of season

Left club during season

References

Notes

Watford
Watford F.C. seasons